Bewdley Rowing Club is a rowing club on the River Severn, based at Riverside North, Wribbenhall, Bewdley, Wyre Forest District, West Midlands.

Club colours
The blade colours are blue and gold; kit: indigo with a (quite broad) gold band.

History
The club was founded in 1877 and is open to all age groups.

The club won the prestigious Double Sculls Challenge Cup at the Henley Regatta with the Leander Club in 1983 and the Queen Mother Challenge Cup with the Maidenhead Rowing Club in 1984 and Thames Tradesmen's Rowing Club in 1985.

Honours

Henley Royal Regatta

British champions

References

Rowing clubs in England
Rowing clubs of the River Severn
Bewdley